KPOO (89.5 FM) is a community radio station licensed to San Francisco, California, United States. The station is owned by Poor People's Radio. It broadcasts from a building in the Fillmore district.

Poor People's Radio was conceived of and named by a radio engineer, Meyer Gottesman. Meyer determined that the frequency was available and applied for a construction permit from the FCC. Upon the application, Meyer advertised for community involvement in the Berkeley Barb newspaper. After three community meetings, the concept had "legs" as shown by a turn out of over 100 community activists at a church at the corner of Oak and Baker Streets in San Francisco.  It is one of the many stations operated by community broadcasters Lorenzo Milam and Jeremy Lansman.  The station broadcasts meetings of various local governing bodies as well as different and varied music shows.

Programming 

KPOO features music and talk radio from local community activists.  The music originally featured was jazz, blues and R&B from the 1950s, 1960s and 1970s.  In the summer of 1982, KPOO started playing rap music on Sunday afternoons from 3pm-7pm with DJ LeBaron Lord King and Marcus Clemmons. 

KPOO broadcasts local public commentaries and talk programs with community and national Black leaders discussing what's going on in the Black community locally and nationally.  The focus on the community continues with commentaries on a variety of talk and music programs.  Some of the featured music programming includes salsa, jazz, blues, rap/hip hop, Latin, gospel and reggae, as well as an American Indian talk/music program, and local and national musicians host weekly music programs.

Funding 
The radio station seeks funding from the government, grants, and hosts fundraisers.<ref

See also
List of community radio stations in the United States

Notes

External links
FCC History Cards for KPOO
KPOO official website

POO
Community radio stations in the United States
Radio stations established in 1994
1994 establishments in California